Tilava is a village in the Istočno Sarajevo in Istočno Novo Sarajevo municipality, Republika Srpska, Bosnia and Herzegovina.

References

Istočno Sarajevo
Populated places in Istočno Novo Sarajevo
Villages in Republika Srpska